Mary Stafford  may refer to:

Mary Stafford (singer)
Mary Boleyn Stafford (c.14991543), sister of Queen Anne Boleyn and a mistress of Henry VIII